Stanley Mathenge wa Mirugi (born c. 1919 in Mahiga, Nyeri District) was a Mau Mau military leader.

Background
Before the Mau Mau freedom struggle, he had fought in Burma. Later he became the leader of the Forty Group, an organisation supporting the Kenya African Union (KAU). He also founded the Kenya Riigi, a group of courageous fighters. Mathenge believed in traditional Kikuyu religion. In May 1953 he became the leader of the newly formed  Mau Mau military unit Nyeri District Council and Army. His rivalry with field marshal Dedan Kimathi harmed integrity of the Mau Mau movement.

Disappearance
He disappeared in 1955 and was later reported to be allegedly living in Ethiopia. Mathenge left with his battalion to Ethiopia where he is said to have died in 2016.
His wife Muthoni is still alive and resides in Mweiga, Nyeri.
One prevailing conspiracy theory is that he was killed in his power rivalry with Kimathi, who then made up the story that Mathenge had gone to Ethiopia to seek assistance from Haile Selassie.

Later events
On May 30, 2003 a man believed to be Stanley Mathenge, living in Ethiopia, was invited to Kenya by president Mwai Kibaki and was given a hero's welcome by the state. It was soon revealed that the man was Ato Lemma Ayanu, who himself denied being Mathenge. A DNA test published four years later proved he was not Mathenge.

See also 
List of people who disappeared

References 

1910s births
1950s missing person cases
Kenyan rebels
Missing people
People from Nyeri County
People of the Mau Mau Uprising